My Holocaust is an American novel by Tova Reich. The novel was published in the year 2007. The novel is a satire on commercialization of Holocaust remembrance. My Holocaust focuses on the slaughter of 6 million Jews during the 1930s and 1940s. Reich uses a clear strategy to attract attention after reams of genuine or sanctimonious tears have drowned many people's capacity to feel real grief.

References

2007 American novels
American satirical novels
Novels about the Holocaust
HarperCollins books